Antonia Lottner (born 13 August 1996) is an inactive German tennis player.

Lottner has won seven singles titles and six doubles titles on the ITF Women's Circuit. In June 2018, she reached her best singles ranking of world No. 128. In April 2015, she peaked at No. 131 in the doubles rankings.

Career highlights

In June 2017, Lottner won her first WTA Tour match in s-Hertogenbosch, Netherlands. As a qualifier she upset then-world No. 6, Dominika Cibulková, in the first round.

Grand Slam performance timeline

Only results in WTA Tour and Grand Slam tournaments main-draw, Olympic Games and Fed Cup are included in win–loss records.

Singles
Current through the 2022 WTA Tour.

WTA 125 tournament finals

Singles: 1 (1 runner–up)

ITF Circuit finals

Singles: 8 (7 titles, 1 runner–up)

Doubles: 14 (6 titles, 8 runner–ups)

Junior Grand Slam finals

Girls' singles: 1 (1 runner–up)

Head-to-head records

Record against top 10 players

  Andrea Petkovic 2–0
  Bianca Andreescu 1–0
  Dominika Cibulková 1–0
  Barbora Krejčíková 1–0
  Veronika Kudermetova 1–0
  Belinda Bencic 1–1
  Patty Schnyder 1–1
  Caroline Garcia 0–1
  Johanna Konta 0–1
  Anett Kontaveit 0–1
  Jeļena Ostapenko 0–1
  Jessica Pegula 0–1
  Aryna Sabalenka 0–1
  Ons Jabeur 0–3

* .

Top 10 wins

References

External links

 
 
 

1996 births
Living people
Sportspeople from Düsseldorf
German female tennis players
Tennis people from North Rhine-Westphalia